The United Nations Educational, Scientific and Cultural Organization (UNESCO) designates World Heritage Sites of outstanding universal value to cultural or natural heritage which  have been nominated by countries which are signatories to the UNESCO World Heritage Convention, established in 1972. Cultural heritage consists of monuments (such as architectural works, monumental sculptures, or inscriptions), groups of buildings, and sites (including archaeological sites). Natural features (consisting of physical and biological formations), geological and physiographical formations (including habitats of threatened species of animals and plants), and natural sites which are important from the point of view of science, conservation or natural beauty, are defined as natural heritage. Lithuania accepted the convention on 31 March 1992, making its natural and historical sites eligible for inclusion on the list. The first site added to the list was the Vilnius Historic Centre, in 1994. Three further sites were added in 2000, 2004, and 2005. In total, there are four sites on the list, all of them cultural. Two sites are transnational: the Curonian Spit is shared with Russia and the Struve Geodetic Arc is shared with nine other countries. In addition to its World Heritage Sites, Lithuania also maintains two properties on its tentative list.



World Heritage Sites 
UNESCO lists sites under ten criteria; each entry must meet at least one of the criteria. Criteria i through vi are cultural, and vii through x are natural.

Tentative list
In addition to sites inscribed on the World Heritage List, member states can maintain a list of tentative sites that they may consider for nomination. Nominations for the World Heritage List are only accepted if the site was previously listed on the tentative list. As of 2022, Lithuania lists two properties on its tentative list.

See also

References

Lithuania
Landmarks in Lithuania
 
Protected areas of Lithuania
World Heritage Sites
World Heritage Sites
Cultural heritage of Lithuania